Dio Chrysostom (Dion Chrysostomos), Dion of Prusa or Cocceianus Dio (c. 40 – c. 115 AD), was a Greek orator, writer, philosopher and historian of the Roman Empire in the 1st century AD.  Eighty of his Discourses (or Orations) are extant, as well as a few letters, a mock essay Encomium on Hair, and a few other fragments. His sobriquet Chrysostom comes from the Greek , which literally means "golden-mouthed".

Life
He was born at Prusa (now Bursa), in the Roman province of Bithynia (now part of northwestern Turkey). His father, Pasicrates, seems to have bestowed great care on his son Dio's education. At first he lived in Prusa, where he held important offices, composed speeches and other rhetorical and sophistical essays, and studied philosophy. The Stoic and Platonist philosophies, however, appear to have had the greatest charms for him, particularly the stoicism of Musonius Rufus.

He went to Rome during Vespasian's reign (69–79 AD), by which time he seems to have got married and had a child. He became a critic of the Emperor Domitian, who banished him from Rome, Italy, and Bithynia in 82 for advising one of the Emperor's conspiring relatives. He claims that, on the advice of the Delphic oracle, he put on the clothes of a beggar, and with nothing in his pocket but a copy of Plato's Phaedo and Demosthenes's On the False Embassy, he lived the life of a Cynic philosopher, undertaking a journey to the countries in the north and east of the Roman empire. He thus visited Thrace, Mysia, Scythia, and the country of the Getae, giving orations.

He was a friend of Nerva, and when Domitian was murdered in 96 AD, Dio used his influence with the army stationed on the frontier in favour of Nerva. Under Emperor Nerva's reign, his exile was ended, and he was able to return home to Prusa. He adopted the surname Cocceianus, reflecting Nerva's nomen, Cocceius. Dio addressed his four Orations on Kingship to Nerva's successor, Trajan, and appears to have known the Emperor personally, claiming "I am perhaps as well acquainted with your character as anyone." He knew Apollonius of Tyana and Euphrates of Tyre. In his later life Dio had considerable status in Prusa, and Pliny the Younger reports that he was involved in a lawsuit about a civic building project around 111. He probably died a few years later.

Writings
Dio Chrysostom was part of the Second Sophistic school of Greek philosophers which reached its peak in the early 2nd century during the Antonine period. He was considered one of the most eminent of the Greek rhetoricians and sophists by the ancients who wrote about him, such as Philostratus, Synesius, and Photius. This is confirmed by the eighty orations of his which are still extant, and which were the only ones known in the time of Photius. These orations appear to be written versions of his oral teaching, and are like essays on political, moral, and philosophical subjects. They include four orations on Kingship addressed to Trajan on the virtues of a sovereign; four on the character of Diogenes of Sinope, on the troubles to which men expose themselves by deserting the path of Nature, and on the difficulties which a sovereign has to encounter; essays on slavery and freedom; on the means of attaining eminence as an orator; political discourses addressed to various towns which he sometimes praises and sometimes blames, but always with moderation and wisdom; on subjects of ethics and practical philosophy, which he treats in a popular and attractive manner; and lastly, orations on mythical subjects and show-speeches. He argued strongly against permitting prostitution. Two orations of his (37 and 64) are now assigned to Favorinus. Besides the eighty orations we have fragments of fifteen others, and there are extant also five letters under Dio's name.

He wrote many other philosophical and historical works, none of which survive. One of these works, Getica, was on the Getae, which the Suda incorrectly attributes to Dio Cassius.

Editions
 Hans von Arnim, Dionis Prusaensis quem uocant Chrysostomum quae exstant omnia (Berlin, 1893–1896).
 C. Bost-Pouderon, Dion Chrysostome. Trois discours aux villes (Orr. 33–35) (Salerne, 2006).
 C. Bost–Pouderon (ed.), Dion de Pruse dit Dion Chrysostome. Oeuvres (Or. XXXIII–XXXVI (Paris, CUF, 2011).
 Trans. J. W. Cohoon, Dio Chrysostom, I, Discourses 1–11, 1932. Harvard University Press, Loeb Classical Library:
 Trans. J. W. Cohoon, Dio Chrysostom, II, Discourses 12–30, 1939.
 Trans. J. W. Cohoon & H. Lamar Crosby, Dio Chrysostom, III, Discourses 31–36, 1940.
 Trans. H. Lamar Crosby, Dio Chrysostom, IV, Discourses 37–60, 1946.
 Trans. H. Lamar Crosby, Dio Chrysostom, V, Discourses 61–80. Fragments. Letters, 1951.
 H.-G. Nesselrath (ed), Dio von Prusa. Der Philosoph und sein Bild [Discourses 54–55, 70–72], introduction, critical edition, commentary, translation, and essays by E. Amato et al., Tübingen 2009.

Notes

Further reading
 Eugenio Amato, Xenophontis imitator fidelissimus. Studi su tradizione e fortuna erudite di Dione Crisostomo tra XVI e XIX secolo (Alessandria:  Edizioni dell'Orso, 2011) (Hellenica, 40).
 Eugenio Amato, Traiani Praeceptor. Studi su biografia, cronologia e fortuna di Dione Crisostomo (Besansçon: PUFC, 2014).
 T. Bekker-Nielsen, Urban Life and Local Politics in Roman Bithynia: The Small World of Dion Chrysostomos (Aarhus, 2008).
 Aldo Brancacci, Rhetorike philosophousa. Dione Crisostomo nella cultura antica e bizantina (Napoli: Bibliopolis, 1986) (Elenchos, 11).
 P. Desideri, Dione di Prusa (Messina-Firenze, 1978).
 A. Gangloff, Dion Chrysostome et les mythes. Hellénisme, communication et philosophie politique (Grenoble, 2006).
 B.F. Harris, "Dio of Prusa", in Aufstieg und Niedergang der Römischen Welt 2.33.5 (Berlin, 1991), 3853–3881.
 C.P. Jones, The Roman World of Dio Chrysostom (Cambridge, MA, Harvard University Press, 1978).

 Simon Swain, Hellenism and Empire. Language, Classicism, and Power in the Greek World, AD 50–250 (Oxford, 1996), 187–241.
 Simon Swain. Dio Chrysostom: Politics, Letters, and Philosophy (Oxford, 2000).

External links

Texts of Dio
 Complete works at LacusCurtius (English translation complete; some items in Greek also)

Secondary material
 Dio Chrysostom at Livius.Org
 Introduction to the Loeb translation at LacusCurtius

40 births
115 deaths
1st-century Greek people
2nd-century Greek people
1st-century Romans
2nd-century Romans
1st-century philosophers
2nd-century philosophers
1st-century historians
2nd-century historians
Greek-language historians from the Roman Empire
Roman-era Cynic philosophers
Roman-era Sophists
People from Bithynia
Ancient Greeks in Rome
Historians from Roman Anatolia